Grubbia is a genus of flowering plants in the family Grubbiaceae. The genus has three species, all endemic to the Cape Floristic Region of South Africa. The fruit is a syncarp.

Grubbia was named by Peter Jonas Bergius in 1767 in a Swedish journal entitled Kongliga Vetenskaps Academiens Handlingar. The generic name honors the Swedish botanist Michael Grubb.

Grubbia was revised by Sherwin Carlquist in 1977. Grubbia gracilis, Grubbia hirsuta, and Grubbia pinifolia had all been recognized, at least by some authors, at species rank, but Carlquist treated them as subspecies or varieties of Grubbia rosmarinifolia. Some authors had recognized a second genus, Strobilocarpus, in the family Grubbiaceae, but Carlquist assigned its two species, Strobilocarpus rourkei and Strobilocarpus tomentosa to Grubbia.

Molecular phylogenetic studies have shown that Grubbia is sister to Curtisia, another genus from South Africa. It has been suggested that Grubbia and Curtisia might be combined into a single family. This was not followed by the Angiosperm Phylogeny Group in the APG III system of 2009.

References

External links 
 Grubbia At: Plant Names At: IPNI
 CRC World Dictionary of Plant Names: D-L At: Botany & Plant Science At: Life Science At: CRC Press
 Grubbia At: Index Nominum Genericorum At: References At: NMNH Department of Botany At: Research and Collections At: Smithsonian National Museum of Natural History
 Grubbia (exact) At: Names At: Tropicos At: Science and Conservation At: Missouri Botanical Garden
 Grubbia At: List of Genera At: Grubbiaceae At: List of Families At: Families and Genera in GRIN  At: Queries At: GRIN taxonomy for plants
 Grubbia At: Grubbiaceae At: Cornales At: Asteridae At: core eudicots (Gunneridae) At: Eudicotyledoneae In: ··· Embryophyta At: Streptophytina At: Streptophyta At: Viridiplantae At: Eukaryota At: Taxonomy At: UniProt

Cornales
Endemic flora of South Africa
Cornales genera
Taxa named by Peter Jonas Bergius